James M. Richardson (born 1960) is a retired United States Army lieutenant general who last served as Deputy Commanding General for Combat Development of the United States Army Futures Command from 2018 to 2022, as well as the Acting Commander of Futures Command from 2021 to 2022. He was commissioned in 1983, through ROTC at the University of South Carolina. He is married to General Laura J. Richardson.

Later career
A leader in new combat technologies, Richardson has been a speaker on these topics at defense and academic symposia including the annual Space & Missile Defense Symposium.

Awards and decorations

References

1960 births
United States Army personnel of the Iraq War
United States Army personnel of the War in Afghanistan (2001–2021)
American Master Army Aviators
Living people
People from Myrtle Beach, South Carolina
Recipients of the Defense Superior Service Medal
Recipients of the Distinguished Flying Cross (United States)
Recipients of the Distinguished Service Medal (US Army)
Recipients of the Legion of Merit
United States Army generals
University of South Carolina alumni